Sedgemoor District Council is the local authority for the district of Sedgemoor in Somerset, England. The council is elected every four years. Since the last boundary changes in 1999, 50 councillors have been elected from 25 wards.

Political control
Since the foundation of the council in 1973 political control of the council has been held by the following parties:

Leadership
The leader of the council since 2005 has been:

Council elections
1973 Sedgemoor District Council election
1976 Sedgemoor District Council election
1979 Sedgemoor District Council election (New ward boundaries)
1983 Sedgemoor District Council election (District boundary changes took place but the number of seats remained the same)
1987 Sedgemoor District Council election (District boundary changes took place but the number of seats remained the same)
1991 Sedgemoor District Council election (District boundary changes took place but the number of seats remained the same)
1995 Sedgemoor District Council election
1999 Sedgemoor District Council election (New ward boundaries increased the number of seats by one)
2003 Sedgemoor District Council election
2007 Sedgemoor District Council election
2011 Sedgemoor District Council election (New ward boundaries)
2015 Sedgemoor District Council election
2019 Sedgemoor District Council election

District result maps

By-election results

1999-2003

2003-2007

References

By-election results

External links
Sedgemoor District Council

 
Sedgemoor
Sedgemoor
Sedgemoor